

V

V'lana

Vakox, Professor (also known as Va-Kox)
Val Armorr (also known as Karate Kid)
Val Colby
Valda
Vale, Emmet
Vale, Jimmie (Columbia Pictures)
Vale, Lance (also known as Nickel) (Amalgam Comics)
Valentina Armorr
Valentina Vostok (also known as Negative Woman, Valentina Vostock and White Queen)
Valentine, Brenda
Valentine, Eddie
Valerie Perez
Valestra, Salvatore (Warner Bros. Animation (DCAU))
Validus
Valkyra the Commander
Valley, Jean Paul (also known as Azrael and Batman)
Valor (see Lar Gand)
Vampirus (Hanna-Barbera)
van Cleer, Cameron (alias of Killer Moth (I))
Van Dorn, Janet (Warner Bros. Animation (DCAU)
Van Horn, Gunther (see Ragnorak)
Vance, Bobby (Warner Bros. Animation (DCAU))
Vance, John (also known as Batman, Junior)
Vance, Robert (Warner Bros. Animation (DCAU))
Vandal
Van-Dal (an imaginary alias of Supergirl)
Vandal Savage (also known as Vandar Adg)
Vandor
Vane, Commissioner
Van-El
Vanessa Kapatelis (also known as Silver Swan and Nessie Kapatelis)
Vanessa Van Helsing
Vanguard
Van'n Intraktus, Magaan
Vanquisher (I) & (II)
Van-Zee (also known as Nightwing)
Vanzetti, Jocko-Boy
Vapor (also known as Carole Donahue)
Vara (DC Elseworlds)
Varix
Varnathon
Vartox (also known as Vernon O'Valeron)
Vasco, Javier (Vertigo)
Vassa (Filmation)
Vath Sarn
Vectron (DC Elseworlds)
Vega, Colonel
Veilmist
Vela (also known as Hel)
Velvet Tiger
Venelia
Venev
Venizz
Ventriloquist
Ventrix, Helen (Warner Bros. Animation (DCAU))
Ventrix, Kimberly "Kimmy" (Warner Bros. Animation (DCAU))
Ventrix, Lloyd "Eddie" (also known as See-Thru Robber) (Warner Bros. Animation (DCAU))
Venus Sivana
Veon (also known as Red Lantern of Space Sector 435)
Vera Black (also known as Sister Superior and Miss Morphine)
Verchenko, Oksana (also known as White Queen (I))
Veridium (I) (also known as Will Magnus)
Veridium (II) (also known as David Magnus)
Vermeer, Tibo (Vertigo)
Veronica Cale
Veronica Vreeland (Warner Bros. Animation (DCAU))
Vess, Baldwin P. (also known as Bulletproof) (Hasbro)
Vestion
Vext
Vibe
Vic Sage (also known as Question)
Vice (also known as Red Lantern of Space Sector 13)
Vice Admiral Fangschleister (20th Century-Fox Television)
Vicious
Vicker, Charlie
Vicki Grant (also known as Victoria Grant)
Vicki Vale
Victor Fries (also known as Mister Freeze)
Victor Ray (also known as Rain) (Vertigo)
Victor Stone (also known as Cyborg)
Victor Von Doom (also known as Doctor Doomsday) (Amalgam Comics)
Victor Zsasz (also known as Mr. Zsasz)
Victoria Ngengi (also known as Flint) (WildStorm)
Vid, Garmin
Vidar (see Universo)
Vidar, Rond
Vigilante (I-IX)
Vikhor (also known as Feodor Sorin)
Viking
Viking Prince (I) & (II)
Vikram (Warner Bros.)
Vilsi Vaylar (Warner Bros. Animation)
Vilmos Egan (Warner Bros. Animation (DCAU'))
Vimana, Lorna
Vince Everett (Warner Bros. Television)
Vincent Del Arrazzio
Vincent Velcoro (Velcro)
Vincent Edge
Vincent Yatz
Vincent, Harry (Condé Nast Publications)
Violet
Violet
Viperie
Virago
Virman Vundabar
Virtuoso
Visi-Lad (also known as Rhent Ustin)
Vitamin Flintheart (Tribune Media Services)
Vivian D'Aramis (also known as Crimson Fox)
Vivienne (also known as Lady of the Lake) (Vertigo)
Vixen
Vizacacha
Vode-M
Voice-Over (also known as Andy Greenwald)
Void (Warner Bros. Animation)
Void (WildStorm)
Void Hound (also known as Enigma (II)
Volcana (Warner Bros. Animation)
Volcanic Monster (Filmation)
Volcano Man
Volk
Volt, Lord (also known as Karak)
Volthoom (also known as the First Lantern)
Voltro the Champion
Von Bach (DC Elseworlds)
Von Bloheim (20th Century-Fox Television)
Von Daggle
von Gunther, Paula, Baroness (also known as Paula von Guntha (Earth-1))
Von Hagen, Constance (Vertigo)
von Hammer, Hans (also known as Hammer of Hell and (erroneously) Enemy Ace)
von Mauler, Nakia
von Mauler, Űman
Von Vroon
Vond-Ah (Warner Bros.)
Voodoo (WildStorm)
Vorb-Un
Vortex
Vox (I)
Vox (II) (see Mal Duncan)
Vox Populi (also known as Addie Vochs) (WildStorm)
Voxv (also known as King Voxv)
Voz
Vreeland, Bunny (Warner Bros. Animation (DCAU'))
Vril Dox (also known as Brainiac 2 and Vril Dox II)
Vril Dox (also known as Brainiac)
Vroom, Hans
Vul, Tri
Vulcan
Vulcan
Vulco (Vertigo)
Vulko, Nuidis
Vulture (also known as Armand "Army" Lydecker)
Vykin (also known as Vykin the Black)
Vyronis, Konstantin (also known as Vyronis)

Valerie van Haaften

Valerie van Haaften is a supervillain in the DC Universe who took the name the Puzzler.

The character, created by Geoff Johns and Pascual Ferry, first appeared in Superman (vol. 2) #187 (December 2002).

Valerie van Haaften is a Superman fan who attempted to join a number of superhero groups in order to meet him. She eventually decides to become a villain called the Puzzler in order to get his attention. Later, she is hired by Intergang to assassinate Clark Kent.

Powers and abilities of Valerie van Haaften
 As the Puzzler, Valerie van Haaften's body was composed of living "puzzle pieces".

Val-El 
Val-El is a character in DC Universe who appears in Superman stories. Although first appearing as a statue in Superboy (vol. 1) #136 (January 1967), his background is further explored in Krypton Chronicles #1-2 (September-October 1981).

Val-El was a Kryptonian explorer and member of the House of El. He was responsible for discovering lands that would later become known as Bokos, Vathlo and Lurvan.

The tablet written by Bur-El taught Val how to build a compass, which he used at the helm of the sailing ship 1-Val. He and his brother Tro-El were the first from Erkol to set foot on Vathlo where they befriended the native population and replenished their supplies. After Vathlo, Val went into the rescue of sailers from the 3-Van, which was smashed by a sea monster Pryllgu.

A statue of Val-El holding a ship's wheel was erected and placed within the House of El family memorial vault on the planet Krypton. The statues were blasted away and turned to Kryptonite in the final catastrophe, before being plated with lead by Superboy and transferred to Rokyn.

In other media 
Val-El appears in TV series Krypton, portrayed by Ian McElhinney. This version is a scientist, a member of the House of El and Seg-El's grandfather.

In the first season, 200 hundred years before the birth of Kal-El, Val is sentenced to death by the Council and Voice of Rao. Years later, Seg discovers his Fortress of Solitude where he worked here and meets his holographic version. Seg soon finds out that Val uncovered the evidence of Voice of Rao as a puppet controlled by Brainiac, who wants to steal Kandor City and destroy Krypton. The holographic Val assists to Seg and his friends and allies in their resistance and fight against him. The real Val is later revealed to be alive in the Phantom Zone by General Zod who stole his device to travel and left him there. In the season one finale, Val is later released by Zod and assists Seg and others in their battle for Kandor City. Seg, Zod and Val trap Brainiac into the Phantom Zone, but Seg is also pulled into it by his enemy. After being trapped, Val tries to save him, but Zod destroys his Phantom Zone projector to prevent Brainiac's return.

In the second season, six months after General Zod took a power, Val is a co-leader of the resistance with Jax-Ur, former leader of Black Zero. After their hideout is uncovered, he and Jax go to the moon Wegthor via space elevator to gather the rebels and prepare the fight against Zod's regime. After some resistance against Sagitari, their leadership worsens when Jax kills the captive Primus Lyta-Zod, as a result of Dru's attempt to deceive the rebels. He convinces others to denounce her barbaric act and takes the leadership while Jax is put in prison. She later escapes in underground tunnels in the attempt to destroy space elevator in order to weaken Zod's forces. Val ultimately accepts her offer, but soon banishes her due to recent murder. Val later reunites with Seg, who warns him of Zod's army from their interstellar ship and Doomsday weapon. While Seg and Kem go to activate the explosives to slow down Doomsday, Nyssa captures the ship with others. Val and several rebels escape from the moon, which is soon destroyed as a result of wide chain reaction of explosives combined with stellarium. Seg also escapes from the moon. All rebels (except Kem - who died on the moon; and Nyssa - who steals Adam's Zeta Beam's device in her attempts to save her and Seg's son Jor-El from Brainiac and transports to planet Rann) land in Outlands outpost, reuniting with Jayna, Dev-Em and the real Lyta who is alive (the one who was killed was her clone created by Dru-Zod). After Seg and Lyta go to Kandor to confront Zod, Val stays to participate in the battle against Sagitari. After Seg and Lyta defeat Zod and Sagitari is pulled from the battlefield, Val celebrates the victory with Seg and Adam Strange in the bar.

Fredric Vaux

Fredric Vaux is a supervillain in the DC Universe. The character, created by Paul Levitz, first appeared in Adventure Comics #463.

Fredric Vaux is an enemy of the Justice Society of America.

John Vance
An earlier version of Batman Junior made one appearance in Detective Comics #231 (May 1956), in a story written by Edmond Hamilton, with art by Sheldon Moldoff. In the story, Batman Junior is John Vance, a boy who once helped Batman as his sidekick long before Robin (Dick Grayson at the time) had arrived. John re-enters Batman's life to solve yet another case, making Robin feel that he is about to be replaced. Apart from a reprint of the story in Batman #185 (October–November 1966), John Vance has not reappeared since.

Brenda Del Vecchio
Brenda Del Vecchio is a friend of Jamie Reyes and Paco Testas, and the niece of the crimelord La Dama. Created by writers Keith Giffen and John Rogers along with artist Cully Hamner, she first appeared in Infinite Crisis #3 (February 2006).

Brenda Del Vecchio in other media
Brenda Del Vecchio is mentioned in the video game Injustice 2 in character dialogue between the Blue Beetle and Firestorm.

References

 DC Comics characters: V, List of